David Garro Trefgarne, 2nd Baron Trefgarne,  (born 31 March 1941), is a British Conservative politician.

Biography
The son of George Trefgarne, 1st Baron Trefgarne, Trefgarne succeeded his father as 2nd Baron Trefgarne in 1960 at the age of 19, having attended Haileybury and Imperial Service College.  He took his seat in the House of Lords on his 21st birthday in 1962. In contrast to his father, who was a Liberal and later Labour politician, he chose to sit on the Conservative benches.

Trefgarne was an opposition Whip from 1977 to 1979 and then served in the Conservative administration of Margaret Thatcher as a Government Whip from 1979 to 1981 and as Parliamentary Under-Secretary of State at the Department of Trade in 1981, at the Foreign and Commonwealth Office from 1981 to 1982, at the Department of Health and Social Security from 1982 to 1983 and at the Ministry of Defence from 1983 to 1985. The latter year he was promoted to Minister of State for Defence Support, a post he held until 1986, and then served as Minister of State for Defence Procurement from 1986 to 1989 and as a Minister of State at the Department of Trade and Industry from 1989 to 1990. In 1989 he was admitted to the Privy Council.

He was president of the Institution of Incorporated Engineers when they merged with the Institution of Electrical Engineers in 2006.

Lord Trefgarne is still a member of the House of Lords as one of the ninety hereditary peers elected by their colleagues to remain after the passing of the House of Lords Act of 1999. According to the Electoral Reform Society, he has since blocked further reform of the Lords, tabling 'wrecking' amendments to a draft Bill to abolish by-elections for hereditary peers, proposed by Lord Grocott in 2018.

He became the longest-serving member of the House of Lords on 26 April 2021 after the retirement of Lord Denham.

Arms

References
Who's Who
Burke's Peerage

1941 births
Living people
Princeton University alumni
Barons in the Peerage of the United Kingdom
Conservative Party (UK) Baronesses- and Lords-in-Waiting
Members of the Privy Council of the United Kingdom
People educated at Haileybury and Imperial Service College
Hereditary peers elected under the House of Lords Act 1999